Janko Tipsarević was the defending champion and successfully defended his title, defeating Oscar Otte 6–3, 7–6(11–9) in the final.

Seeds

Draw

Finals

Top half

Bottom half

References

Main Draw
Qualifying Draw

ZS-Sports China International Challenger - Singles
2017 in Chinese tennis